Saint Narcissus may refer to:

Narcissus of Athens, apostle
Narcissus, Argeus, and Marcellinus (died 320), martyrs
Narcissus of Jerusalem (99–216), bishop of Jerusalem
An early bishop of Girona who converted Saint Afra (4th century)

See also
San Narciso (disambiguation)

Human name disambiguation pages